Fran Gamba  was a politician of the 18th century in Slovenia, when the country was under the Holy Roman Empire. He became mayor of Ljubljana in 1764. He was succeeded by Janez Mihael Kuk in 1766.

References

Mayors of places in the Holy Roman Empire
Mayors of Ljubljana
Year of birth missing
Year of death missing
18th-century Carniolan people